KUCB is a non-commercial radio station in Unalaska, Alaska, broadcasting on 89.7 FM. It signed on in October 2008 to replace KIAL 1450 AM. KUCB generally broadcasts local programming, plus programming from National Public Radio, Native Voice One and Alaska Public Radio. The KIAL radio and television stations were formerly owned by the municipality of Unalaska; due to municipal cutbacks they now operate as an independent non-profit organisation dependent largely on individual donors. Shortly after its sell-off, KIAL, which only broadcast at 50 watts, moved to the FM dial as KUCB, with a stronger signal.

Television
KUCB also operates KUCB-LP a 10-watt low-powered television station on channel 8. The majority of the channel's schedule consists of a community bulletin board, although several hours of locally produced programs are also shown. While some sources identify the station as K08IW, FCC records indicate that a station with these calls became KIAL-LP on August 5, 2005, with KUCB-LP assigned on August 15, 2008, to Unalaska Community Broadcasting Inc. in Dutch Harbor, Alaska to replace the KIAL-LP calls. As of 2022, the station is silent.

References

External links
 KUCB FM 89.7 / KUCB Channel 8 TV website
 Current status of KUCB-LP in the FCC database
 
 KUCB-LP 8 on RECnet broadcast query

UCB
Aleutians West Census Area, Alaska
Non-profit organizations based in Alaska
NPR member stations
Radio stations established in 2005
UCB
UCB
Unalaska, Alaska